South Africa national basketball team is the basketball team that represents South Africa in international competitions. The governing body of the team is Basketball South Africa.

Team South Africa is one of FIBA's youngest members, as it joined in 1992, yet it has qualified for every FIBA Africa Championship between 1997 and 2011.

Competitive record

AfroBasket

African Games

1999: 6th
2007: 7th
2011: 10th

Commonwealth Games

2006: 7th
2022: TBD

Team

Current roster
Team for AfroBasket 2017:

At the AfroBasket 2017 in Tunisia and Senegal, Lehlogonolo Tholo played most minutes and recorded most assists and steals for South Africa.

Depth chart

Past rosters
FIBA Africa Championship Qualification 2015:

FIBA Africa Championship 2011: finished 14th among 16 teams

FIBA Africa Championship 2009: finished 15th among 16 teams

FIBA Africa Championship 2007: finished 13th among 16 teams

FIBA Africa Championship 2005: finished 12th among 12 teams

FIBA Africa Championship 2003: finished 9th among 12 teams

Coach. Sam Vincent (Mobile Revelers -USA)
Emmanuel Madondo (180-G-80)
Lowell Mndaweni (178-G-76)
Joseph Mazibuko (190-G-80) Levski Sophia (BUL)
Sifiso Ngoobo (192-G-78)
Kenneth Motaung (195-F-78)
Nyakallo Nthuping (200-C-80)
Floid Mtimkulu (196-F-81)
Craig Ngobeni Tsakani (198-F-83)
Quinton Denyssen (203-C/F-80) Wits University Rebels
Thuso Moiloa (199-C-78) 21882
Thabang Kgwedi (198-F-78)
Lesego Molebatsi (201-F/C-82)

FIBA Africa Championship 2001: finished 12th among 12 teams
Mazibuko Joseph 192 G 80
Uniacke David 208 C 69
Madondo Emanuel 180 G 81
Jesinskis Paul 200 F 81
Molebatsi L. Prince 201 F 82
Gilchrist Craig 200 F 70
Trauernicht Chris 209 C 76
Ngcobo Ndaba Sifiso 189 G 78
Maepa Lepo 204 C 84
Ntunja Vincent 184 G 81
Maxima Mokoena 189 G 81
Denyssen Quinton 203 C 80
Head Coach : Zoran Zupcevic

Head coach position
  Zoran Zupcevic – 2001
  Sam Vincent – 2003
 Terry Pretoritis – 2005
  Flosh Ngwenya – 2007–11
  George Makena – 2014, 2015
  Craig Gilchrist – 2017

Kit

Sponsor
2011: National Lottery

See also
South Africa national under-19 basketball team
South Africa national under-17 basketball team
South Africa women's national basketball team
South Africa women's national under-19 basketball team
South Africa women's national under-17 basketball team

References

External links
FIBA profile
South Africa Basketball Records at FIBA Archive
Africabasket - South Africa Men National Team
MyBasketball South Africa

Videos
South Africa Basketball YouTube.com video

1992 establishments in South Africa
Men's national basketball teams